The Maritime Squadron of the Armed Forces of Malta is the naval component of the Maltese military. The Maritime Squadron has responsibility for the security of Maltese territorial waters, maritime surveillance and law enforcement, as well as search and rescue. It is based at Hay Wharf in Floriana.

The Maritime Squadron was established in November 1970 as the Maritime Troop of the Malta Land Force. Its name changed a number of times:
Maritime Troop of the Malta Land Force (1970–1971)
1st (Maritime) Battery of the Malta Land Force (1971–1973)
1st (Maritime) Battery of the Armed Forces of Malta (1973–1980)
Maritime Squadron of the Armed Forces of Malta (1980–present)

History 

Malta's first navy was built when it was under the Order of Saint John. It was a powerful navy with ships such as the Santa Anna. The Order participated in various naval exploits against the Ottoman Empire while based in Malta, most notably the Battle of Lepanto of 1571 and the Battle of the Dardanelles of 1656. In the 17th and early 18th centuries Maltese vessels also went for corsairing expeditions against Muslim ships. Eventually corsairing decreased and the Order was weak and bankrupt, so there was little resistance when Napoleon landed on Malta in 1798. The Order's navy, including the ships of the line San Zaccharia and San Giovanni, was integrated into the French navy and Malta no longer had its own naval force.

Soon after the British occupied the island, the Mediterranean Fleet of the Royal Navy transferred its base to Malta. Malta became a hub of naval activity due to its harbours and strategic position, and it remained so during the Second World War and until the 1960s. The Mediterranean Fleet was disbanded in 1967, and three years later Malta's first naval force appeared after over 150 years. The Maritime Troop of the Malta Land Force was established in November 1970 and two Swift boats were transferred to Malta from the United States Coast Guard in January 1971. In July 1971 the force was renamed 1st (Maritime) Battery of the Malta Land Force and was based in Senglea. In the 1970s, the number of patrol boats increased as West Germany and Libya gave Malta some of their former customs launches. In 1973 a vessel built at the Malta Drydocks for the Customs Department was taken over by the Maritime Battery.

In 1977, the Battery moved to its present base at Hay Wharf, or Xatt it-Tiben. In 1978, the British gave Malta two search and rescue launches, and in 1979 they left Malta completely, handing over all their former responsibilities to the Battery. On 1 April 1980 it was renamed Maritime Squadron of the Armed Forces of Malta, as it is today. In the 1980s and 1990s, Yugoslavia, the United States, Italy gave more vessels to Malta. Malta purchased patrol boats for the first time in 1992, when former East German minesweepers and patrol boats were bought from Germany. The Swift, Kondor and Bremse classes from the 1960s and 1970s were all decommissioned between 2004 and 2012 as new vessels replaced them.

The worst peacetime incident of the Maritime Squadron was the C23 tragedy on 7 September 1984. Illegal fireworks which were to be dumped from a patrol boat exploded, killing five soldiers and two policemen.

On 18 February 2015 it was announced that the Emer class offshore patrol vessel  would be transferred from the Irish Naval Service as a short term measure pending Malta's purchase of a new OPV. It was commissioned into the AFM on 28 June 2015 as P62.

A new base for the Maritime Squadron is currently being built, also at Hay Wharf.

Current structure

Headquarters Command 
The Headquarters Command is responsible for base security, transportation and anything necessary for sustaining the patrol boats throughout the year. It is therefore responsible for the supply of all the fuel and ammunition.

Offshore Command 
The Offshore Command operates the Protector-class P51 and P52 and the modified Diciotti class vessel P61, the flagship of the Maltese navy. The Offshore command formerly operated the Kondor I-class P29, P30 and P31 vessels until these were decommissioned in 2004.

Inshore Command 
The Inshore Command operates the four P21-class patrol boats, as well as the Search and Rescue launches Melita I and Melita II. The Command also includes the Rapid Deployment Platoon who operate using any of the Inshore Command vessels, the fast interceptors such as P01 or using aircraft from the Air Wing.

G Command 

G Command is responsible for military activity on the island of Gozo. The Land Component consists of a platoon strong element which provide assistance to the Malta Police and various Government departments, as well as securing the territorial integrity of Gozo. The Maritime Component consisted of three crews operating the Bremse-class patrol boat P32 around Mġarr Harbour. P32 was decommissioned in 2012 and now the G Command operates a single Melita Class SAR Launch and a Defender Class CPB.

Support Command 
Support Command is responsible for the upkeep of the maritime craft and equipment. It also incorporates equipment and supply management.

Vessels of the AFM

Current fleet
These vessels are in active service as of 2015:

The European commission voted €110 million in funds for the AFM. The government used these funds to purchase the four P21 (Austal) class patrol vessels and has bought 2 new Beechcraft Super King Air offshore maritime surveillance aircraft for the Air Wing of the Armed Forces of Malta.

Future 
In 2015 the Maltese Government was looking to further expand the Maritime Squadron as the Diciotti-class P61 was struggling to keep up with the demands faced by patrolling Malta's large SAR Region and its territorial waters, as well as being in need of a major overhaul. Considering the gap that would be left for such as overhaul to take place, the Irish Naval Service donated the LÉ Aoife to help reduce the strains on the P61. Thus the government announced that it would procure a purpose built vessel that would cost in the region of €40 million partly financed by the European Union's Internal Border Funding. The new offshore patrol vessel will roughly have the same capabilities held by the current P61, as well as being larger, having longer endurance and also including a flight deck. The procurement of the new offshore patrol vessel was confirmed on 19 January 2019, when a ceremony was hold to announce the award of the contract to construct the new vessel to Cantiere Navale Vittoria. The new offshore patrol vessel, which will be the new flagship, will have pennant number P71 and will cost €35 million, €26 million of which will be contributed by the European Union.

Decommissioned vessels
A list of vessels since retired by the AFM.

References

External links 

Overview of the Maritime Squadron at the official AFM website
Overview of AFM patrol vessels at the official AFM website

Malta
Military of Malta
Military units and formations established in 1970
1970 establishments in Malta